The national flag of Djibouti is a horizontal flag bicolor with equal bands of light blue and light green, with a white, equilateral triangle at the hoist. In the center of the triangle is a red star. The flag combines the basic layout and colors from the flag of the Front de Libération de la Côte des Somalis. The light blue represents the sky and the sea, as well as the Somalis, green represents the everlasting green of the earth, as well as the Afars, white represents the colour of peace and the five point red star represents unity, the blood shed by the martyrs of independence, as well as Djibouti being one of the five regions inhabited by the Somali people.

History
Beginning in the mid-19th century before the establishment of the French Somaliland, other flags were used as the flag of the Ottoman Empire, Sultanate of Tajoura and as well religious flags. During  the French Somaliland and French Territory of the Afars and the Issas, the only ensign used was the tricolor. The flag was created and designed by the Front for the Liberation of the Somali Coast (FLCS) as the party official flag in the 1960s, which was guerrilla group who fought for the independence of Djibouti from France. With the help of Ligue Populaire Africaine pour l'Indépendance (LPAI) to independence in 1977. The Djiboutian flag was raised for the first time upon independence on 27 June 1977, by the head of police Yacine Yabeh Galab. It is today flown on many governmental buildings.

Characteristics
Specifically, this flag consists of two horizontal bands blue and green, and a white isosceles triangle located on the side of the pole. In the middle of the triangle, a red five-pointed star appears.

The meaning of this flag is also found in the national anthem of Djibouti, with some differences:
 
 
 
 

In the middle of the triangle, a red five-pointed star symbolizes national unity.

Color
Note: as there is no official standard, the below are approximations.

Historical flags

The following are the flags historically used in the territory of present-day Djibouti:

See also
History of Djibouti
Djibouti (anthem)
Djibouti (country)
Djibouti (city)

References

External links
CIA World Factbook - Djibouti

Flags of Africa
Flag
Flags introduced in 1977
Djibouti